The 2010–11 season will be Kecskeméti TE's 3rd competitive season, 3rd consecutive season in the Nemzeti Bajnokság I and 99th year in existence as a football club.

Team kit and logo
The team kits for the 2010–11 season are produced by Jako and the shirt sponsor is Ereco. The home kit is purple and white colour and the away kit is white colour.

Transfers

Summer

In:

Out:

Club

Coaching staff

Top scorers
Includes all competitive matches. The list is sorted by shirt number when total goals are equal.

Last updated on 24 November 2010

Disciplinary record
Includes all competitive matches. Players with 1 card or more included only.

Last updated on 24 November 2010

Overall
{|class="wikitable"
|-
|Games played || 21 (15 Soproni Liga, 3 Hungarian Cup and 3 Hungarian League Cup)
|-
|Games won || 11 (6 Soproni Liga, 3 Hungarian Cup and 2 Hungarian League Cup)
|-
|Games drawn ||  1 (0 Soproni Liga, 0 Hungarian Cup and 1 Hungarian League Cup)
|-
|Games lost ||  9 (9 Soproni Liga, 0 Hungarian Cup and 0 Hungarian League Cup)
|-
|Goals scored || 44
|-
|Goals conceded || 39
|-
|Goal difference || +5
|-
|Yellow cards || 35
|-
|Red cards || 4
|-
|rowspan="1"|Worst discipline ||   Attila Gyagya (6 , 0 )
|-
|rowspan="1"|Best result || 4–0 (H) v Szolnoki MÁV FC – Hungarian League Cup – 24-11-2010
|-
|rowspan="1"|Worst result || 2–6 (A) v Debreceni VSC – Nemzeti Bajnokság I – 14-08-2010
|-
|rowspan="1"|Most appearances ||  Vladan Čukić (19 appearances)
|-
|rowspan="2"|Top scorer || Attila Tököli (6 goals)
|-
| Francis Litsingi (6 goals)
|-
|Points || 34/63 (53.97%)
|-

Nemzeti Bajnokság I

Classification

Results summary

Results by round

Matches

MTK Budapest FC: Szatmári – Pintér, Sütő, Szekeres, Vadnai (Zámbó 63.) – Kanta (Nikházi 90.), Pátkai, Szabó (Könyves 70.), Vukadinovic – A. Pál, Tischler. Coach: József Garami.
Kecskeméti TE – Ereco: Holczer – Lambulic, Némedi, Alempijevic – Bori, Cukic, Ebala, Foxi (Csordás 60.), Savic (Koncz 60.) – Tököli, Litsingi (A. Simon 75.). Coach: István Urbányi.
G.: Tischler (6.), Kanta (28.), Pintér (63.), Könyves (71.) – Litsingi (32.), Tököli (33.)
Y.: Pátkai (53.), Szabó (67.), Sütő (93.), Pál (93.) – Bori (21.), Csordás (77.), Cukic (78.), Tököli (85.)
R.: Könyves (88.) – Bori (89.)

Kecskeméti TE: Holczer – Némedi, B. Balogh, Lambulic, I. Farkas – Litsingi, Ebala, Cukic (Dosso 75.), Savic (Csordás 80.) – Foxi (Wilson 80.), Tököli. Coach: István Urbányi.
Ferencvárosi TC: Ranilovic – Csizmadia, Z. Balog, Tutoric, Junior – Andrezinho (B. Tóth 61.), Maróti, Stanic (Pisanjuk 86.), Rósa, D. Kulcsár (Abdi 75.) – Heinz. Coach: László Prukner.
G.: Tököli (45.) – Rósa (4.), Abdi (87.)
Y.: Ebala (41.), Cukic (70.) – Csizmadia (49.), Heinz (67.)

Debreceni VSC: Malinauskas – Komlósi, Bernáth, Mijadinoski, Laczkó – T. Kulcsár (J. Varga 53.), Czvitkovics, Z. Kiss, P. Szakály (Dombi 76.) – Coulibaly, Kabát. Coach: András Herczeg.
Kecskeméti TE: Holczer – Némedi (A. Simon 64.), B. Balogh, Lambulic, I. Farkas – Bori, Litsingi, Ebala, Savic (Cukic 46.) – Csordás (Foxi 46.), Tököli. Coach: István Urbányi.
G.: Z. Kiss (18.), Coulibaly (33.), Czvitkovics (47., 84.), Kabát (86.), Dombi (91.) – Foxi (49., 74.)
Y.: Ebala (75.), Cukic (87.), Holczer (91.)
R.: Z. Kiss (87.) – Tököli (77.)

Kecskeméti TE: Rybansky – Bori, Gyagya (Némedi 43.), Lambulic, Balogh – Ebala (Wilson 46.), Cukic, Koncz – Foxi, Simon (Dosso 78.), Litsingi. Coach: István Urbányi.
Szolnoki MÁV FC: Rézsó – Cornaci, Pető, Hegedűs, Schindler – Remili, Búrány (Vörös 72.), Pisanjuk, Tchami (Ngalle 69.), Molnár – Alex (Marozas 46.). Coach: Attila Vágó.
G.: Simon (3. – pen.), Litsingi (5., 43.), Balogh (20.) – Alex (16.), Remili (76. – pen.)
Y.: Lambulic (21.), Gyagya (29.) – Hegedűs (3.), Pető (18.), Pisanjuk (26.), Búrány (52.)
R.: Molnár (85.)

Zalaegerszegi TE: Vlaszák – Kovács, Miljatovic, Bogunovic, Varga – Szalai, Kamber, Illés (Delic 78.), Máté – Rajcomar (Horváth 83.), Balázs (Kocsárdi 88.). Coach: János Csank.
Kecskeméti TE: Rybánsky – Bori, Lambulic, Balogh, Farkas (Holczer 68.) – Némedi, Cukic (Savic 55.), Koncz (Dosso 83.) – Foxi, Tököli, Litsingi. Coach: István Urbányi.
G.: Rajcomar (9. – pen., 73.) – Némedi (83. – pen.)
Y.: Kamber (17.), Miljatovic (60.), Bogunovic (64.) – Rybánsky (8.)
R.: Miljatovic (82.) – Rybánsky (66.)

Kecskeméti TE: Rybánsky – Farkas (Cukic 55.), Gyagya, Némedi, Balogh, Mohl – Bori, Csordás, Savic (Bertus 66.), Ebala – Tököli (Balog 92.). Coach: László Losonczy.
Szombathelyi Haladás: Rózsa – Lengyel, Schimmer, Guzmics, Tóth – Molnár, Sipos (Lattenstein 80.), Á. Simon – Nagy, Kenesei (Oross 64.), Irhás (Obric 64.). Coach: Aurél Csertői.
G.: Némedi (79. – pen.)
Y.: Tököli (4.) – Irhás (12.), Molnár (20.)

Lombard-Pápa TFC: Szűcs – Takács (Venczel 90.+9), Farkas, Bíró, Németh – Quintero, Gyömbér, Heffler – Abwo (Rebryk 33.), Bárányos, Maric (Jovánczai 90.+2). Coach: György Véber.
Kecskeméti TE – Ereco: Holczer – Bori, Gyagya, Lambulic, Balogh (Mohl 55.) – Ebala, Cukic, Koncz (Savic 72.), Alempijevic (Csordás 46.) – Litsingi, Tököli. Coach: István Urbányi.
G.: Gyömbér (8.), Takács (13.), Rebryk (40.), Heffler (90.+8) – Gyagya (11.)
Y.: Gyömbér (30.), Heffler (72.) – Holczer (40.), Bori (43.), Lambulic (45.), Koncz (63.)

Kecskeméti TE: Rybánsky – Balogh (Wilson 85.), Gyagya, Lambulic, Mohl – Alempijevic, Cukic, Koncz – Litsingi (Csordás 56.), Tököli, Foxi (Bori 72.). Coach: István Urbányi.
Paksi SE: Csernyánszki – Heffler (Lisztes 91.), Fiola, Éger, Csehi – Sipeki, Bartha, Böde, Vayer (Báló 74.) – Montvai, Kiss (Magasföldi 65.). Coach: Károly Kis.
G.: Montvai (90.+4)
Y.: Fiola (44.), Böde (47.), Csehi (75.), Éger (79.), Montvai (82.)
R.: Alempijevic (69.) – Magasföldi (77.)

Kaposvári Rákóczi FC: Kovács – Okuka, Zahorecz, Zsók, Gujic – Hegedűs (Kulcsár 53.), Balázs, Pedro (Grúz 85.), Jawad (Pavlovic 73.) – Oláh, Peric. Coach: Tibor Sisa.
Kecskeméti TE: Rybánsky – Némedi, Gyagya, Balogh, Mohl – Csordás, Cukic, Koncz (Savic 60.), Litsingi (Bori 55.), Foxi – Tököli. Coach: István Szabó.
G.: Jawad (19.), Oláh (37.) – Gyagya (12.)
Y.: Oláh (15.) – Bori (64.), Cukic (71.), Gyagya (87.)

Budapest Honvéd FC: Kemenes – Takács, Debreceni, Botis, Hajdú – Abass, Akassou, Coira (Conteh 72.), Danilo – Rouani (Bojtor 79.), Rufino (Sadjo 60.). Coach: Massimo Morales.
Kecskeméti TE: Rybánsky – Némedi, Gyagya, Balogh (Lambulic 46.), Mohl – Bori, Ebala (Alempijevic 54.), Cukic – Foxi, Tököli (Litsingi 84.), Bertus. Coach: Tomislav Sivic.
G.: Rouani (49.) – Tököli (18., 43.)
Y.: Akassou (61.) – Ebala (45.), Foxi (78.)
R.: Akassou (78.)

Kecskeméti TE: Rybánsky – Némedi, Lambulic, Gyagya, Mohl – Bori, Cukic, Foxi (Savic 62.), Ebala, Bertus (Csordás 47.) – Tököli (Litsingi 52.). Coach: Tomislav Sivic.
Videoton FC Fehérvár: Bozovic – Lázár, Lipták, Vaskó, Andic – Gosztonyi (Nikolic 61.), Sándor (Szakály 80.), Farkas, Elek, Djordjic (Polonkai 46.) – Alves. Coach: György Mezey.
G.: Némedi (21. – pen.), Csordás (74.) – Alves (27., 46.), Polonkai (62.), Nikolic (71.)
Y.: Gyagya (53.), Savic (66.) – Nikolic (72.), Polonkai (74.)

Győri ETO FC: Radosavljevic – Fehér, Stanisic, Dordevic, Szabó (Völgyi 15.) – Tokody (Ganugrava 90.), Pilibaitis, Trajkovic, Koltai (Sharashenidze 62.) – Ceolin, Bouguerra. Coach: Attila Pintér.
Kecskeméti TE – Ereco: Rybánsky – Alempijevic, Némedi, Balogh, Mohl – Bori (Csordás 80.), Cukic (Dosso 80.), Foxi, Savic (Ebala 64.), Litsingi – Tököli. Coach: Tomislav Sivic.
G.: Pilibaitis (18. – pen.), Bouguerra (38.) – Némedi (45.+2 – pen.)
Y.: Fehér (16.), Dordevic (58.), Völgyi (72.) – Ebala (76.), Litsingi (82.)

Kecskeméti TE: Rybánsky – Alempijevic (Patvaros 82.), Gyagya, Balogh, Mohl – Bori (Tököli 65.), Némedi, Cukic, Savic, Foxi (Csordás 82.) – Litsingi. Coach: Tomislav Sivic.
Újpest FC: Balajcza – Szokol (Kiss 58.), Takács, Vermes, Pollák – Simek (Simon 70.), Egerszegi, Mitrovic, Böőr – Rajczi, Tisza (Barczi 70.). Coach: Géza Mészöly.
G.: Foxi (9.), Alempijevic (48.), Tököli (67.), Cukic (80.) – Böőr (39.), Rajczi (87. – pen.), Barczi (89.)
Y.: Alempijevic (49.), Gyagya (75.), Rybánsky (84.) – Vermes (22.), Szokol (57.)

BFC Siófok: Molnár – Mogyorósi, Fehér, Graszl, Novák – Homma (Piller 70.), Tusori, Kecskés (Délczeg 46.), Lukács – Sowunmi, Ivancsics (Kocsis 77.). Coach: István Mihalecz.
Kecskeméti TE – Ereco: Rybánsky – Bori (Ebala 67.), Bagi, Balogh, Mohl – Cukic, Foxi, Savic, Litsingi (Csordás 82.), Alempijevic – Tököli (Dosso 89.). Coach: Tomislav Sivic.
G.: Mohl (39. – o.g.) – Foxi (43.), Tököli (76.)
Y.: —

Kecskeméti TE: Rybánsky – Némedi (Ebala 40.), Gyagya, Balogh, Mohl – Cukic, Foxi, Savic (Bori 80.), Litsingi (Csordás 76.), Alempijevic – Tököli. Coach: Tomislav Sivic.
Vasas SC: Végh – Balog, Gáspár, Kovács, Mileusnic (Arnaut 39.) – Arsic, Pavicevic, Dobric (Phantkhava 70.), Németh (Bakos 62.), Katona – Ferenczi. Coach: András Komjáti.
G.: Alempijevic (10.), Litsingi (60.), Ebala (67.) – Németh (30.)
Y.: Némedi (40.) – Gáspár (66.)

Hungarian Cup

Third round

Békéscsaba 1912 Előre SE: Stumpf – Oláh, Csiszár, Makra, Juhász – Szélpál, Olteanu, Horváth (Lázok 69.), Pozsár – Bernáth (Csák 61.), Balázs (Bakró 58.). Coach: József Pásztor.
Kecskeméti TE – Ereco: Rybansky – Mohl, Lambulic, Gyagya, Alempijevic – Némedi, Cukic, Ebala, Litsingi – Csordás (Foxi 69.), Dosso (Tököli 19.). Coach: István Urbányi.
G.: Balázs (35.) – Gyagya (40.), Alempijevic (76.)
Y.: Oláh (80.) – Gyagya (82.)

Fourth round

Tiszakanyár SE: Gazsi – Gombkötő (Hadházi 60.), Tóth, Fekete, Balázsi – Orgonáv, Kóka, Simon (Marics 46.), Jánvári – Kiss (Deák 46.), Dolhai. Coach: Máté Gerliczki.
Kecskeméti TE – Ereco: Rybánsky – Alempijevic, Bagi, Némedi, Farkas (Szabó 64.) – Savic, Cukic (Tölgyesi 62.), Litsingi (Patvaros 72.) – Csordás, Dosso, Bertus. Coach: Tomislav Sivic.
G.: Cukic (15.), Dosso (17., 62.)

Fifth round

First leg

Debreceni VSC: Verpecz – Bernáth, Komlósi, Máté, Korhut – Bódi, Spitzmüller, Kiss, Pavlovic (Szűcs 51.) – Kabát (Laczkó 57.), Szilágyi (Coulibaly 64.). Coach: András Herczeg.
Kecskeméti TE – Ereco: Rybánsky – Némedi, Gyagya, Balogh, Mohl – Litsingi (Bori 56.), Ebala (Csordás 74.), Cukic (Savic 54.), Alempijevic – Tököli, Foxi. Coach: Tomislav Sivic.
G.: Litsingi (23.), Alempijevic (43., 50.)
Y.: Kabát (40.) – Némedi (61.), Alempijevic (64.), Bori (90.)
R.: Máté (47.)

League Cup

Group stage

Kecskeméti TE: Z. Tóth – Bori (I. Farkas 60.), Gyagya, Koncz, Alempijevic (Foxi 46.) – Cukic (Tölgyesi 46.), Bertus, Bagi, Wilson – A. Simon (Ebala 10.), Dosso (T. Szabó 60.). Coach: István Urbányi.
Budapest Honvéd FC: Kunsági – Baráth (G. Nagy 46.), Remes, Cséke, Czár (A. Nagy 46.) – Sós, Hidi, A. Horváth (Azevedo 46.), Bojtor (M. Farkas 75.) – Vólent, Haruna (Vernes 72.). Coach: Krisztián Gabala.
G.: Wilson (32., 69.), A. Simon (33.), Koncz (43.) – Haruna (46.), Vólent (66.)
Y.: Cséke (45.)

Szolnoki MÁV FC: Tarczy – Schindler, Antal (Stanisic 60.), Rokszin – Búrány, Mile (Vörös 51.), Lengyel, Tchami – Ngalle (Molnár 83.), Remili (Koós 51.), Hevesi-Tóth (Szalai 62.). Coach: Antal Simon.
Kecskeméti TE: Tóth – Bagi, Urbán, Gyagya (Tölgyesi 46.), I. Farkas (Máté 72.) – Patvaros (Brdaric 52.) – Csordás, Hegedűs (Nagy 46.), Bertus (A. Farkas 52.), Szabó – Dosso. Coach: Tomislav Sivic.
G.: Koós (58.) – Csordás (91.)
Y.: Antal (23.) – Szabó (70.)

Kecskeméti TE: Holczer – Koszó, Urbán, Bagi, I. Farkas – Patvaros (Tölgyesi 46.), Bertus (A. Farkas 63.), Ebala (Savic 46.), Bori (Litsingi 46.) – Dosso, Csordás (Foxi 46.). Coach: Tomislav Sivic.
Szolnoki MÁV FC: Tarczy – Schindler, Urbán-Szabó, Antal, Rokszin – Hevesi-Tóth, Vörös (N. Tóth 72.), Tchami (Felföldi 63.), Blaskovits (Szép 85.) – Lengyel, Kalmár (Kalóz 88.). Coach: Antal Simon.
G.: Dosso (30., 55.), Savic (59. – pen.), Litsingi (70.)
Y.: Ebala (32.) – Hevesi-Tóth (27.), Tarczy (58.), Antal (73.)

References

External links
 Eufo
 Official Website
 UEFA
 fixtures and results

2010-11
Hungarian football clubs 2010–11 season